Imamzadeh Shahzadeh Hoseyn (also Romanized as Emāmzādeh Shāhzādeh Ḩoseyn; also known as Emāmzādeh Ḩoseyn) is a religious site in Chendar Rural District, Chendar District, Savojbolagh County, Alborz Province, Iran. At the 2006 census, its population was 118, in 32 families.

References 

Populated places in Savojbolagh County